Bharat Bandh is a 1991 Telugu political thriller film directed by Kodi Ramakrishna and produced by A. Subhash. The film stars Vinod Kumar, Archana, Rahman and Costumes Krishna in the lead roles. The music was composed by Vijaya Shekhar.

Cast
Vinod Kumar
Archana
Rahman
Kolla Ashok Kumar
Costumes Krishna

Soundtrack

"Deshamitta Tagaladipotundi"
"Bharat Bandh Voice"
"Tappu Ledu Oppu Ledu"
"Swatantra Bharatam"
"Idenaa Jaati Pragati"

References

External links

1991 films
1990s Telugu-language films
Indian political films
Indian political thriller films
Fictional portrayals of the Andhra Pradesh Police
Films directed by Kodi Ramakrishna